William Earl Webb (September 17, 1897 – May 23, 1965) was an American right fielder in Major League Baseball, playing from 1925 to 1933. He played for five teams, including the Boston Red Sox for three years. He batted left-handed, and threw right-handed. He was born in White County, Tennessee and died in Jamestown, Tennessee. 

In 1931, while playing for the Red Sox, he hit a record 67 doubles, a record that still stands today. He had a career batting average of .306 (661-for-2161) with 56 home runs and 333 runs batted in. Webb finished second in the league in extra base hits in 1931 with 84. His .333 batting average in 1931 was seventh-highest in the American League. He also finished sixth in the 1931 American League Most Valuable Player voting.  

He died on May 23, 1965 at his home in Jamestown, Tennessee.

See also
 List of Major League Baseball doubles records
 List of Major League Baseball annual doubles leaders

References

External links

1897 births
1965 deaths
Major League Baseball right fielders
Boston Red Sox players
Chicago Cubs players
Chicago White Sox players
Detroit Tigers players
New York Giants (NL) players
Major League Baseball coaches
Clarksdale Cubs players
Knoxville Smokies players
Louisville Colonels (minor league) players
Los Angeles Angels (minor league) players
Memphis Chickasaws players
Milwaukee Brewers (minor league) players
Pittsfield Hillies players
Toledo Mud Hens players
Baseball players from Tennessee
People from White County, Tennessee
People from Cumberland County, Tennessee
People from Jamestown, Tennessee